Club Atlético de Pinto is a Spanish football team based in Pinto, in the autonomous community of Madrid. Founded in 1963 it plays in Tercera División – Group 7, holding home matches at Estadio Amelia del Castillo, which has a capacity of 2,500 spectators.

Season to season

25 seasons in Tercera División

Famous managers
 Slaviša Jokanović

References

External links
Official website 
Futbolme team profile 

Football clubs in the Community of Madrid
Association football clubs established in 1963
1963 establishments in Spain